Gregory VIII (died 1137), born Mauritius Burdinus (Maurice Bourdin), was antipope from 10 March 1118 until 22 April 1121.

Biography
He was born in the Limousin, part of Occitania, France. He was educated at Cluny, at Limoges, and in Castile, where he was a deacon at Toledo. In 1098/1099 his Cluniac connections recommended him as Bishop of Coimbra. After a four-year pilgrimage to the Holy Land, he was made Archbishop of Braga in 1109. There he was one of the principal agents of the Burgundian Henry, Count of Portugal, in his reorganization of the Portuguese church.

Portugal was then a fief of León, and the ambitious Count Henry pursued a vigorous program of ecclesiastical and political autonomy. By 1114, Mauritius had become embroiled in a dispute with the Spanish primate and papal legate in Castile, Bernard of Toledo, to the extent that he was called to Rome and suspended by Pope Paschal II (1099–1118). Nevertheless, he found favor at the papal court, and in 1116, when Emperor Henry V (1105–1125) invaded Italy during the ongoing confrontations over the Emperor's rights of investiture of clerics, Paschal II sent Mauritius with some cardinals on an embassy to the emperor, while the Pope and the Curia fled south to Benevento. Mauritius openly espoused the cause of Henry, and  defected to the Emperor's side. Henry V went to Rome, and on Easter Sunday, March 23, 1117, was crowned Holy Roman Emperor by Mauritius. Paschal II deposed and excommunicated Henry V and removed Mauritius from office.

Papacy
When Paschal II died on 24 January 1118, he was succeeded by Pope Gelasius II (1118–19). Henry V went to Rome but Gelasius II escaped to Gaeta and refused to meet the Emperor to discuss German affairs. Partly in reprisal the imperial party among the cardinals then annulled Gelasius II's election, and on March 1, 1118 Mauritius was proclaimed Pope, taking the name Gregory VIII. Gelasius II, at Capua, proceeded to excommunicate both Gregory VIII and Henry V on April 7, 1118.

After Gelasius II's death, when Calixtus II had been elected Pope in 1119, Henry V was induced to change papal allegiance, in the Concordat of Worms of 1122. Calixtus II entered Rome, and Gregory VIII left, going to Sutri, where he was in April 1121, when papal troops of Calixtus II closed up the city for eight days until its citizens surrendered antipope Gregory VIII. He was taken to Rome and imprisoned in the Septizonium. After having been moved in confinement from monastery to monastery, he finally died at La Cava, Salerno, some time after August 1137.

Cardinals
No information has been found about the cardinals created by Gregory VIII, but it is known that in March 1118 three cardinals created by Antipope Clement III (1080/84-1100) joined his obedience and formed his own Sacred College:
Romanus — cardinal-priest of S. Marco and provost of the titular church of S. Marcello
Cinthius — cardinal-priest of S. Crisogono
Teuzo — cardinal-priest, former legate of Clement III in Hungary

References

External links
Cardinals of the Roman Catholic Church: Election of March 8, 1118
The Catholic Encyclopedia

Year of birth uncertain
Gregory 08
Gregory 08
12th-century antipopes
12th-century French people
Gregory 08
Gregory 08
Gregory 08
Gregory 08
Gregory 08
Gregory 08
Roman Catholic archbishops of Braga
Bishops of Braga
Bishops of Coimbra